Drosera is open source orienteering competition management software, which is part of orienteering toolbox. It is written as Java EE server with web interface and REST API for communication with other programs. It is built to use electronic punching system such as SPORTIdent.

As of 2012 the software is still in beta stage, but it has been used in managing several live competitions.

References

Free software
Cross-platform free software
Free software programmed in Java (programming language)
2010 software